Kacey Ainsworth (born 19 October 1968) is an English actress, best known for portraying the role of Little Mo in the BBC soap opera EastEnders and Cathy Keating in ITV drama Grantchester.

Early life
Ainsworth trained at the Royal Central School of Speech and Drama from 1991 to 1994.

Career
In 2000, Ainsworth joined the cast of BBC soap opera EastEnders, She portrayed the role of Little Mo, and made her final appearance in May 2006.

Ainsworth has also appeared in other television series such as ITV police drama The Bill and detective serial A Touch of Frost. She also starred in Famous and Fearless on Channel 4. In February 2007, Ainsworth appeared in an episode of Hotel Babylon as a tabloid editor. From 2007 to 2008, she appeared in BBC drama HolbyBlue as Inspector Jenny Black.

On 29 March 2014, Ainsworth appeared in Casualty as DS Annie Reardon. Later that year, she began appearing in ITV detective drama Grantchester, as Cathy Keating. In 2017, she portrayed the role of Miss Gullet in CBBC sitcom The Worst Witch.

In 2019 she gave, according to Michael Billington of The Guardian, an "outstanding performance" as Mrs. Lovett in a revival of Stephen Sondheim's Sweeney Todd: The Demon Barber of Fleet Street, at Liverpool's Everyman Theatre.

Filmography
Practice  (1995) – Julia
A Touch of Frost (1996) – Carole Nash
Where the Heart Is (1997) – Tracey
The Bill (1997) – Paula Sheriton
Topsy-Turvy (1999) – Miss Dorothea Fitzherbert
EastEnders (2000–2006) – Maureen 'Little Mo' Mitchell (née Slater) 
Girl from Rio (2001) – Sales Assistant
Hotel Babylon (2007) – Maria Henson
HolbyBlue (2007–2008) – Inspector Jenny Black
Rock & Chips (2010) – Edna
MI High (2011) – Margaret Fontana
Tracy Beaker Returns (2011) – Xanthe
Midsomer Murders (2011) – Nikki Rowntree (episode: Echos of the dead)
Casualty (2014) – DS Annie Reardon
Doctors (2014) – Ruby Slade
Grantchester (2014–present) – Cathy Keating
Call the Midwife (2014) – Nancy
Agatha Raisin (2016) - Francie Juddle
The Worst Witch 2017 (TV Series)- Miss Gullet- (2017)Loose Women (2017–2018) – Herself - guest panellist (3 episodes)Lynn + Lucy (2019) - CarolineMoving On (2020) – Vicky

Awards
British Soap Awards – Best Actress (2002–2003)
National Television Awards – Most Popular Actress (2002)Inside Soap'' Awards – Best Actress (2002)
TV Quick and Choice Awards – Best Soap Actress (2003)

References

External links
 

1968 births
Living people
Actresses from Hertfordshire
Actresses from London
English television actresses
English film actresses
English soap opera actresses
English stage actresses
People from East Hertfordshire District
People from Hoddesdon
People from Ware, Hertfordshire